Amillarus is a genus of beetles in the family Cerambycidae, containing the following species:

 Amillarus apicalis Thomson, 1861
 Amillarus ruficollis (Breuning, 1948)
 Amillarus secundus (Tippmann, 1951)
 Amillarus singularis (Aurivillius, 1922)

References

Agapanthiini